"Ayahuasca" is a single by Swedish singer Veronica Maggio. It was released in Sweden as a digital download on 28 April 2016 as the second single from her fifth studio album Den första är alltid gratis (2016). The song peaked at number 35 on the Swedish Singles Chart.

Track listing

Charts

Weekly charts

Release history

References

2016 singles
2016 songs
Veronica Maggio songs
Universal Music Group singles
Songs written by Veronica Maggio